Uchoi is one of Tripuri clan lives in Tripura state of India and Bangladesh. They are mainly dwelling in the Gomati and the South Tripura districts of Tripura state of India.In Bangladesh, they live in Bandarban Hill District along with other tribes. They speak the language Kokborok which is of Tibeto-Burmese and their dialect is similar with Reang tribe. According to the folk tales, Uchois and Reangs are of same origin.

Language and culture of Uchois are also similar with other Kokborok speaking tribes. They are the least in number among Tripuri tribes around 6000 or more. These people are also found in Lawngtlai, Lunglei and Mamit district of Mizoram and Bandarban and Rangamati of Bangladesh.

The largest religions practiced are Christianity followed by Buddhism and also few numbers following Hinduism.

Usui/Uchoi women weave and worn their own traditional dress while men are now used to wear in Lungyi and shirts like Marma people. Women usually wear big earring and bigger bunch of handmade necklaces known as "Lwkoh" which easily help them to recognize. The skirt is woven in the black -white-red linen and wore as open skirt of like Sarong which is comparatively thick and lowered down to the knee in position. Blouses usually are made or stitched of printed or plan fabric bought from local bazaars.

In Uchois marriage system there was a mandatory rule for staying of bridegroom in the house of father-in-law before the final marriage. But nowadays this system is not prevalent.

The social council of Uchois are very much rigid at one point of time but this type social institute is not so active now. Still the chief of the council "SARPA" sort out the primary problems and disputes among the community members.
Uchoi Gospel Song is Popular Musician Band in Uchoi Community.

See also
 Tripuri people
Kokborok
 Tripuri Dances
 List of Scheduled Tribes in India

References

 

Scheduled Tribes of India
Ethnic groups in Tripura